Torgny Wickman (1911–1997) was a Swedish screenwriter and film director.

Selected filmography
 A Night at Glimmingehus (1954)
 Language of Love (1969)
 The Lustful Vicar (1970)
 Mera ur kärlekens språk (1970)
 Kärlekens XYZ (1971)
 Anita: Swedish Nymphet (1973)

References

Bibliography 
 Jack Stevenson. Scandinavian Blue: The Erotic Cinema of Sweden and Denmark in the 1960s and 1970s. McFarland, 2010.

External links 
 

1911 births
1997 deaths
People from Lund
Swedish film directors
20th-century Swedish screenwriters
20th-century Swedish male writers